John King was a Police Constable at the Eureka Stockade rebellion, one of Australia's few armed uprisings and often characterised controversially as the "birth of democracy" in  Australia.

Born in the parish of Tumurah, County Down, Ireland, son of James King, farmer, and Jane (nee McAllister), he attempted to join the British Army several times, but was rejected on account of his age. Finally on 24 November 1846, aged sixteen, he managed to enlist at Lisburn – partly by raising his age to eighteen. He served as a Private in the 61st Regiment (The South Gloucestershire Regiment) for six years and 306 days – being with the Army of Punjab [sic] in India in 1848-49, being present during the ‘Passage of Cinaub’, and at the battles of Sadsolopoor, Chillianwalla and Goojerat. On 1 March 1853 he paid £18 to gain his discharge from the army and came to Australia. After trying his hand at mining, on 25 March 1854 he joined the police. His record sheet describes him as being ‘age 25, height 5 feet six and a half inches, eyes  grey, hair brown; complexion light’.

After the storming of the Eureka Stockade he was a witness at the subsequent Eureka State Treason Trials. The Eureka Flag was exhibited at the trials and after pieces had been cut off it, it was returned to King, who gained his discharge from the police on 29 March 1855, and tried mining again. However soon afterwards he moved to Ararat where he farmed for six years.  On 16 July 1863 , he married Isabella Convery, Daughter of Bernard King and Mary Ann (nee Moore) and they had seven children: Bernard James, born in 1864 at Warrnambool; Edward born in 1866 in Warrnambool (married Emily Jane Quinton in 1896); Lewis Peter Arthur, born in 1867 at  Warrnambool (married Eliza Grose in 1896); Mary Ann, born in 1869 at Warrnambool (died in infancy); Albert John, born in 1872 at Lake Bolac; Amy Isabel, born in 1875 at Lake Bolac; and William Robert, born in 1878, in Minyip.

The family moved to Warrnambool, and John King ran an aerated water factory for nine years before he moved to Lake Bolac where he ran a mill. Moving again, this time to the Wimmera, he took up land called “Kingsley” at Nullan, near Minyip. There they lived in their old house form Lake Bolac which had been transported by bullock wagon – it was destroyed in a fire in 1951. John King was a member of the Minyip Shire Council and twice President of the shire. He died on 23 October 1881 at Warrnambool, and was buried in the Dunmunkle Cemetery at Minyip. Isabella died in 1900 at Minyip.

In 1895 King’s Family presented the Eureka Flag to the Ballarat Fine Art Gallery. In 1967, it was proven to be genuine, and was formally unveiled by Prime Minister Gough Whitlam on 3 December 1973. John King’s single barrel fowling piece, used at the Eureka Stockade, is on display at Ballarat’s Eureka Centre.

References
Corfield, J.,Wickham, D., & Gervasoni, C. The Eureka Encyclopaedia, Ballarat Heritage Services, 2004.

1830 births
1881 deaths
Australian police officers
Gloucestershire Regiment soldiers
Irish emigrants to colonial Australia